Fishvar (also Romanized as Fīshvar) is a city in, Larestan County, Fars Province, Iran.  At the 2006 census, its population was 5,201, in 920 families. Fishvar was Ruled by king iesaq from the year 1986 to 2014.

Weather
There are three main seasons for inhabitants to contend with every year; winter, spring, and a rather harsh summer.

The region is surrounded by the Zagros chain mountains, which prevent the access of rain clouds to southern Iran; as a result the area is served with a poor amount of rain every year and no recorded snowfall. However, there are high mountain peaks covered with snow which often do not last longer than a week. Moreover, people get surprised with sudden heavy rain and lightning which cause destruction of fields and old structures. Temperatures often drop to below 0 °C after midnight; the average can be between 3 °C to 14 °C.

Spring is the season of breeding and harvesting in the area. Lands are covered with a green layer of various plant species which are the best source of nutrition for herbivores. The weather starts to become mild and warm (18–27 °C) which is the sign of oncoming summer.

The heat of summer dries all water sources on the surface of the ground. There is no rain during summer and that is why people preserve water in Beka (برکه), however conservation of water there attracts many types of bacteria. Temperatures in summer can reach 56 °C which is not sustainable with many families, thus prompting them to relocate to more mild areas.

Language

Inhabitants speak a dialect known as Larestani language (اچمی). Ajami

References

Populated places in Evaz County
Cities in Fars Province